Joachim Louis Napoléon Murat, 8th Prince Murat (born 26 November 1944) is a member of the Bonaparte-Murat family and the current head of the Murat family. He is an important figure in the Napoleonic circles and is very much involved in the commemoration of the Imperial memory. A long time collector of art, he was also the owner and founder of the Museum and Center of Contemporary Art Prince Murat of Nointel (1982-1987).

Family 
The sixth generation descendant of Joachim Murat (1767-1815), Grand Duke of Berg and King of Naples, and his wife Caroline Bonaparte (1782-1839), Joachim Murat is the posthumous son of Joachim Murat (1920-1944), 7th  Prince Murat, and Nicole Véra Claire Hélène Pastré (1921-1982).

Biography
The posthumous and only son of Joachim, 7th Prince Murat, Prince Murat married Laurence Marie Gabrielle Mouton on 11 October 1969 in Paris. They have five children:

Princess Caroline Laetizia Victoire Alix Murat (born 31 October 1971, Neuilly-sur-Seine).
Prince Joachim Charles Napoléon Murat, Prince of Pontecorvo (born 3 May 1973, in Neuilly-sur-Seine) – heir apparent to his father, who married Yasmine Lorraine Briki on 5 March 2021 in Paris.
Princess Laetitia Caroline Marie Pierre Murat (born 27 August 1975, Neuilly-sur-Seine).
Princess Élisa Marie Annonciade Murat (born 16 February 1977, Neuilly-sur-Seine) – twin with Princess Pauline.
Princess Pauline Béatrice Marie Murat (born 16 February 1977, Neuilly-sur-Seine) – twin with Princess Élisa.

Ancestry

References

Genealogy of the Princes Murat – website ChivalricOrders.org
Prince Murat visits the Secretary General of the CAN, with pictures – official website of the Andean Community of Nations (Spanish)

External links
Official website of the House of Murat 

of the First French Empire
|-

1944 births
Living people
20th-century art collectors
21st-century art collectors
20th-century French people
21st-century French people
People from Boulogne-Billancourt
House of Bonaparte
Murat
Princes Murat
French people of American descent